Superman: Man of Tomorrow is a 2020 American animated superhero film based on the DC Comics character Superman. Produced by Warner Bros. Animation, and DC Entertainment, and distributed by Warner Bros. Home Entertainment, it is the first instalment in the Tomorrowverse. The film is directed by Chris Palmer, and written by Tim Sheridan, and stars Darren Criss, Alexandra Daddario, and Zachary Quinto. The film depicts the early days of Clark Kent's career as the superhero Superman.

Plot

Following the planet Krypton's destruction, Kryptonian infant Kal-El was sent by his parents to Earth where he is adopted by farmers Jonathan and Martha Kent who adopt the infant and raise him as "Clark". Year later, Clark works for the Daily Planet as an intern and is known to the public as "the Flying Man" when using his abilities. He attends the launch of an orbital rocket telescope that was made by LexCorp in hopes to seek other life in the universe, however, reporter Lois Lane exposes LexCorp CEO Lex Luthor of the rocket's true plan that would destroy Metropolis and gross neglegiance leading to his arrest. Meanwhile, Clark befriends S.T.A.R. Labs janitor Rudy Jones, who informs Clark about extraterrestrial experiments going on inside the lab. Suddenly, the rocket heads to Metropolis and Clark stops the rocket as the Flying Man. Unbeknownst to Clark, he is being watched by a mysterious figure in a trench coat.

S.T.A.R. Labs detect a UFO grabbing the attention of Clark, who is confronted by an alien bounty hunter named Lobo and learns he is the last of his kind with a bounty on him. During the fight, which is lead to S.T.A.R. Labs, Rudy is caught in the crossfire of the damage being fused with unknown substances while Lobo learns Clark's weakness is Kryptonite. Just as Clark is being beatened by Lobo, the figure appears, revealing himself as a Martian to the public and intervenes. While the Martian distracts Lobo, Clark uses Earth's sun to heal and ultimately defeat Lobo. That night, the Martian introduces himself as J'onn J'onzz to the Kents and reveals Clark's Kryptonian history to him. He then warns Clark to not stay hidden from humanity as they can be Xenophobic despite Clark's disagreenments. Elsewhere, a hospitalised Rudy awakens and discovers he has the ability to drain life, turning them into husks.

Martha gifts Clark a new suit with an "S" imprinted at the front and a cape while the media officially coin the Flying Man as "Superman". Rudy attacks S.T.A.R. Labs in an attempt to gain answers from Lobo but frees him in the process after draining his cell's energy which transforms Rudy into a parasite-like creature and begins invading Metropolis. Superman and J'onn work together to stop Rudy. However, during the battle, Rudy is draining their powers while extracting information from them. The battle results in J'onn's death after being burnt by Rudy. A powerless Superman requests help from Lex from prison to help him restore his abilities by sending him to the sun. Through S.T.A.R. Labs CCTV footage, Superman realises Rudy is the Parasite due to Lobo's grenade which was an organic EMP. The organic EMP consisted of a purple foam/liquid and was designed to absorb any and all energy it came into contact with, but instead bonded with Rudy's DNA to create the Parasite. Lex deduces that the Parasite would have gained Superman's weaknesses from absorbing his energy, and reveals that he has enlisted Lobo after buying out S.T.A.R. Labs.

Lex, Clark, and Lobo devise a plan to lure the Parasite into Metropolis' power plan and use Lobo's Kryptonite ring in hopes to weaken it. The plan becomes unsuccessful when the ring fails prompting Lobo to suicide-bomb the Parasite. Lex equips the ring with a magnifying pulse rifle and shoots the Parasite, ultimately taking it down. Lex then double-crosses Superman but is stopped by an alive J'onn, who faked his death using his abilities. With the plan failed, Superman tries to calm the Parasite down by using his humanity and in turn, Superman formally introduces himself to the world as Kal-El. Suddenly, the power plant begins to overload. The Parasite sacrifices himself to stop it. In the aftermath, Superman and J'onn meet at the roof of The Daily Planet where they also see Lobo alive due to his regeneration. J'onn laments that they are each the last of their species but Lobo reveals there might be more Martians and Kryptonians out there with J'onn heading off to find them.

Voice cast

Note: Batman is seen in a photograph.

Production
In May 2020, the voice cast were revealed for the film. In a July interview with DC Comics, writer Tim Sheridan said he drew inspiration from comics Superman: American Alien and Superman: Birthright, with a touch of several others.

Release
In July 2019, Superman: Man of Tomorrow was revealed at San Diego Comic-Con. The film was released on digital on August 23, 2020, and on Blu-ray, DVD, and on 4K Ultra HD on September 8. The film was made available online for free during DC FanDome on September 12.

Music
A soundtrack album by Kevin Riepl was released by WaterTower Music on September 10.

Reception
The film peaked at #1 of the Top Ten Blu-ray Sellers for Week and the Top Five Home Media Sellers for Week, achieving an HD market share of 100%. It earned $3,234,932 from domestic home video sales.

Jesse Schedeen of IGN rated the film a 7 out of 10: "Superman: Man of Tomorrow is a safe and largely predictable take on the Man of Steel's iconic origin story. While that lack of narrative ambition is disappointing at times, there's a reason this particular story has endured so well over the years. Man of Tomorrow gets to the heart of Clark Kent and the emotional journey he has to experience before he can truly become Superman. With a revamped visual style and a strong voice cast, Man of Tomorrow serves as a solid start for this new animated universe".

The film was nominated for Best Superhero Film at the 2021 Critics' Choice Super Awards.

References

External links

 

2020 direct-to-video films
2020 films
2020 animated films
2020s American animated films
2020s direct-to-video animated superhero films
Animated Superman films
DC Universe Animated Original Movies
2020s English-language films
Warner Bros. direct-to-video animated films
Tomorrowverse